The 2014–15 Championnat de France amateur was the 17th season since its establishment. CS Sedan Ardennes, ASM Belfort, AS Béziers and Les Herbiers VF were promoted.

Teams
There were twelve teams promoted from Championnat de France amateur 2, while two teams were relegated from the 2013–14 Championnat de France amateur. No teams came from the 2013–14 Championnat National. The original plan was to have US Colomiers, RC Strasbourg, Vannes OC and ES Uzès Pont du Gard also relegated from the Championnat National, but due to DNCG and/or FFF rulings, the following clubs were relegated to lower divisions: Luzenac AP (promotion ineligible), USJA Carquefou (voluntary), Vannes (bankruptcy) and Uzès Pont du Gard (bankruptcy). Colomeirs and Strasbourg stayed in Championnat National.

AS Cannes, which ended at 6th in Group B, was declared bankrupt. They were subsequently demoted to the second highest league of their region (7th level overall). Vesoul HSF was also declared bankrupt, while AS Cherbourg voluntarily restarted in their regional leagues. AS Valence folded and was immediately refounded as Olympique de Valence, also restarting in their respective regional divisions.

Because of these vacancies, JA Drancy, FC Montceau Bourgogne, Jura Sud Foot, Tarbes PF, Stade Montois and Stade Plabennécois remained in the CFA.

League tables

Group A

Group B

Group C

Group D

References

External links 
 Official site
 Standings and statistics

 

2014-15
4
Fra